John Nicholas Fazakerley (7 March 1787 – 16 July 1852) was a British Whig
politician.  He was Member of Parliament for Lincoln (1812–18),  Great Grimsby (1818–20), Tavistock (1820), Lincoln again (1826-30) and City of Peterborough (1830–41).

Career
He was elected at the 1812 general election as a member of parliament (MP) for Lincoln,
and held the seat until the 1818 general election, when he was returned for Great Grimsby. He held that seat until the 1820 general election, when was returned for Tavistock, but he resigned his seat two months later, in May 1820, by taking the Chiltern Hundreds.

Fazakerley returned to the Commons after a six-year absence when he was returned at the 1826 general election as MP for Lincoln.
He did not contest the seat at the 1830 election, but was returned at a by-election in 1830 as MP for the City of Peterborough.
He sat for Peterborough until the 1841 election, when he retired from Parliament.

References

External links 
 

1787 births
1852 deaths
Whig (British political party) MPs for English constituencies
Members of the Parliament of the United Kingdom for Great Grimsby
UK MPs 1812–1818
UK MPs 1818–1820
UK MPs 1820–1826
UK MPs 1826–1830
UK MPs 1830–1831
UK MPs 1831–1832
UK MPs 1832–1835
UK MPs 1835–1837
UK MPs 1837–1841
Politics of Lincoln, England
Politics of Peterborough
Members of the Parliament of the United Kingdom for Tavistock